Karawita Central College (:si:Karawita Central College) is one of the main schools in Nivitigala Division, Ratnapura District, Sabaragamuwa Province, Sri Lanka.

External links 
 Home page

Provincial schools in Sri Lanka
Schools in Ratnapura District